Pitcairnia pteropoda is a plant species in the genus Pitcairnia. This species is endemic to Mexico.

References

pteropoda
Flora of Mexico
Plants described in 1937